Vertu Motors PLC is a car dealership group established in 2006 in the United Kingdom. It is listed on the Alternative Investment Market. The company began trading in 2007 after acquiring Bristol Street Motors, a Birmingham-based car dealership, for £38 million cash, £9 million of shares and assumed debt of £29 million. 

The company sells a variety of car marques under the names Vertu, Bristol Street Motors and Macklin Motors, the last of which was acquired by Vertu in Scotland in 2010. The company’s largest acquisition since its establishment with Bristol Street Motors was the £31 million purchase of the Yorkshire-based dealership Farnell Land Rover in 2013. They were rebranded as Vertu Land Rover in 2021. 

The company provides vehicle leasing for personal and business use under the brand Vertu Lease Cars. Vertu also sponsors the Newcastle Eagles basketball team, whose home stadium is now called the Vertu Motors Arena.

References

External links

Companies listed on the Alternative Investment Market
Auto dealerships of the United Kingdom
British companies established in 2006
Retail companies established in 2006